In enzymology, a L,L-diaminopimelate aminotransferase is an enzyme that catalyzes the chemical reaction

LL-2,6-diaminoheptanedioate + 2-oxoglutarate  (S)-2,3,4,5-tetrahydropyridine-2,6-dicarboxylate + L-glutamate + H2O

Thus, the two substrates of this enzyme are LL-2,6-diaminoheptanedioate and 2-oxoglutarate, whereas its 3 products are (S)-2,3,4,5-tetrahydropyridine-2,6-dicarboxylate, L-glutamate, and H2O.

This enzyme belongs to the family of transferases, specifically the transaminases, which transfer nitrogenous groups.  The systematic name of this enzyme class is LL-2,6-diaminoheptanedioate:2-oxoglutarate aminotransferase. Other names in common use include LL-diaminopimelate transaminase, LL-DAP aminotransferase, and LL-DAP-AT.  This enzyme participates in lysine biosynthesis.

Structural studies

References

 

EC 2.6.1
Enzymes of known structure